Derrick O'Connor (3 January 1941 – 29 June 2018) was an Irish theatre and character actor.

O'Connor was best known for his performance as South African mercenary Pieter Vorstedt in Lethal Weapon 2 and for his roles in three Terry Gilliam films. He starred as Jack Stone in the British police drama series The Professionals episode "You'll be Alright". Another role was that of Peter Morgan in the series Crown Court (1976).

He was a member of the Royal Shakespeare Company.

Gilliam, who directed O'Connor in three films, had noted in his audio commentaries that O'Connor seemed to have a habit of relinquishing most of his dialogue in favour of physical character humour. Notable examples include Time Bandits, in which his character's dialogue was resorted to simple grunts while the Maid Marian character "translated" for him and in Brazil, in which O'Connor scrapped all of his character's dialogue and simply repeated the dialogue of Bob Hoskins' character.

He died on 29 June 2018 of pneumonia in Santa Barbara, California at the age of 77.

Filmography

References

External links
 
 

1941 births
2018 deaths
Irish male film actors
Male actors from Dublin (city)
Royal Shakespeare Company members
Deaths from pneumonia in California